Scott v. Shepherd 96 Eng. Rep. 525 (K.B. 1773), commonly known as the "flying squib case," is an important English tort law case on remoteness and the principle of novus actus interveniens as it related to the division between trespass and case.

Facts
Shepherd tossed a squib into a crowded market in the town of Milborne Port in Somerset, where it landed on the table of a gingerbread merchant named Yates. Willis, a bystander, grabbed the squib and threw it across the market to protect himself and the gingerbread. Unfortunately, the squib landed in the goods of another merchant named Ryal. Ryal immediately grabbed the squib and tossed it away, accidentally hitting Scott in the face just as the squib exploded. The explosion put out one of Scott's eyes.

Judgment
The majority held Shepherd was fully liable, because, said De Gray CJ, "I do not consider [the intermediaries] as free agents in the present case, but acting under a compulsive necessity for their own safety and self-preservation."

Nares J wrote the following.

De Grey CJ's judgment was as follows.

Dissent
Blackstone J argued, reflecting the arcane distinctions between trespass on the case and vi et armis, that there was no liability for indirect consequences.

References

See also
English tort law

English tort case law
1773 in case law
English causation case law
1773 in British law
Court of King's Bench (England) cases